The 2013–14 Biathlon World Cup – World Cup 3 was held in Annecy-Le Grand Bornand, France, from 12 December until 15 December 2013.

Schedule of events

Medal winners

Men

Women

Achievements

 Best performance for all time

 , 1st place in Sprint
 , 24th place in Sprint
 , 32nd place in Sprint
 , 61st place in Sprint
 , 101st place in Sprint
 , 37th place in Pursuit
 , 6th place in Sprint
 , 18th place in Sprint
 , 25th place in Sprint
 , 27th place in Sprint
 , 36th place in Sprint
 , 39th place in Sprint
 , 83rd place in Sprint
 , 5th place in Pursuit

 First World Cup race

 , 55th place in Sprint
 , 33rd place in Sprint
 , 70th place in Sprint
 , 88th place in Sprint
 , 89th place in Sprint

References 

2013–14 Biathlon World Cup
Biathlon World Cup
December 2013 sports events in Europe
Biathlon competitions in France
Sport in Annecy